Thomas J. Lynch (1859 – February 27, 1924) was an umpire in Major League Baseball for 13 seasons, all of which were in the National League (NL), between the years of  and . Although his time as league president was considered uneventful, he was replaced following the 1913 season.

In 1946 Lynch had been named to the Honor Rolls of Baseball by the National Baseball Hall of Fame.

References

Further reading
 Tom Lynch biography by SABR

External links
 Career statistics at Retrosheet
 

Sportspeople from New Britain, Connecticut
19th-century baseball umpires
Major League Baseball umpires
Baseball executives
1859 births
1924 deaths
National League presidents